George Braziller (February 12, 1916 – March 16, 2017) was an American book publisher and the founder of George Braziller, Inc., a firm known for its literary and artistic books and its publication of foreign authors.

Life and career
Braziller was first employed as a shipping clerk, during the Great Depression. In 1941, George and Marsha Braziller founded the "Book Find Club", which was smaller than the Book of the Month Club but exceedingly successful, "with a reputation for seriousness of purpose." They then began the "Seven Arts Book Society" in 1951 and in 1955 they began to publish their own books.
The Braziller publishing firm is located at 277 Broadway, Suite 708, in Manhattan, New York City. When Braziller travelled to Europe in the late 1960s, he was in Paris during the events of May 1968 which led to the collapse of the de Gaulle government. Henri Alleg's autobiography La Question, which he brought back from that trip and published in English language translation, was his firm's first big success in the United States.

In 2011 George Braziller retired at the age of 95. His son Michael Braziller of Persea Books, became publisher and editorial director while George's elder son Joel Braziller became secretary-treasurer and director of permissions. With a small team they maintain the Braziller tradition with new series and a rich backlist.

Book series
Book series published by George Braziller have included:
 The American Culture Series
 The American Image Series
 The Arts of Mankind
 The Braziller Series of Poetry 
 The Great American Artists Series
 The Great Draughtsmen Series
 The Great Fresco Cycles of the Renaissance
 Great Religions of Modern Man
 The Masters of World Architecture Series
 New Directions in Architecture
 Planning and Cities
 Vision + Value Series
 World Landscape Art & Architecture Series

Beginning in 1968 also published an implicit series of "excellent editions of partial facsimiles" of medieval manuscripts.

Book series published by Michael Braziller have included:
 The Braziller Series of Australian Poets

References

Further reading
 George Braziller, Encounters: My Life in Publishing, New York: George Braziller, Inc., 2015.

External links
 George Braziller Inc. website
 George Braziller, Inc. Records at Syracuse University
 David Finn, "Interview with George Braziller". 

1916 births
2017 deaths
American book publishers (people)
American centenarians
Men centenarians
People from Brooklyn
Businesspeople from New York City
20th-century American businesspeople